= Agha Khan Iravanski =

Early 20th Century Russian military figure

Aga khan Abbasgulu khan oglu Iravanski — member of the I State Duma of the Russian Empire, military man. Member of the First State Duma of the Russian Empire. May 16, 1906 – July 9, 1906

Aga khan Iravanski was born in an Azerbaijani family. Abbasgulu khan was the son of Iravanski and Tarlan khanum Kangarli.

In 1904, he was a member of the Yerevan City Duma. On February 13, 1906, he signed a peace treaty with the Armenians.

On May 16, 1906, he was elected a member of the First State Duma of the Russian Empire.

Abbasgulu khan is the son of Iravanski. Her daughter Bulbul khanum taught Russian in Yerevan in 1917 and in Gadabay in 1920. Dallar opened women's clubs in Nakhchivan and Yerevan.
